Saint-Sulpice is a railway station in Saint-Sulpice-la-Pointe, Occitanie, France. It is on the Brive–Toulouse (via Capdenac) and Saint-Sulpice–Mazamet railway lines. The station is served by TER (local) services operated by SNCF.

Train services
The following services currently call at Saint-Sulpice:
local service (TER Occitanie) Toulouse–Albi–Rodez
local service (TER Occitanie) Toulouse–Figeac–Aurillac
local service (TER Occitanie) Toulouse–Castres–Mazamet

References

Railway stations in Tarn (department)